The Medal of Valor (Filipino: Medalya ng Kagitingan) is the Armed Forces of the Philippines' highest military honor awarded for a conspicuous deed of personal bravery or self-sacrifice above and beyond the call of duty that distinguishes the recipient from his comrades. It is defined in the Philippine Army Awards and Decorations reference material FC 1–0062, itself adapted from the Armed Forces of the Philippines Awards and Decorations Handbook, Second Edition published in 1997, as an award for "heroism in combat" and is foremost in the order of precedence of awards and decorations of the Armed Forces of the Philippines.

The medal is awarded by the President of the Philippines to members of the Armed Forces of the Philippines and allied military personnel, including recognized guerrilla forces. The Medal of Valor is held in such high regard that the President is required to salute the medal and the individual wearing it.

Under Philippine Republic Act No. 9049, a Medal of Valor awardee is entitled to lifetime monthly gratuity of ₱20,000 that is separate and distinct from any salary or pension the awardee is receiving or will receive from the government. The amount of this monthly gratuity was increased to ₱75,000 in 2016 by President Rodrigo Duterte.

Appearance
The medal is described as a disc adorned with a golden sea-lion in relief holding the eight-rayed Philippine sun, and water waves composed of five blue ripples. The disk rests on a red cross with golden borders and crossed golden swords. The top-most flange of the cross contains three golden stars in a triangular pattern. A golden bar embossed with the phrase "For Valor" connects the medal to a sampaguita wreath consisting of ten white buds and twenty-two green leaves. The wreath serves as a link to the neck ribbon, which is crimson with eight golden stars arranged horizontally forming two parallel lines. The service ribbon, worn in lieu of the medal itself, is similarly crimson with eight golden stars arranged horizontally forming two parallel lines, five stars on the top line and three on the bottom.

The phrase For Valor embossed on the bar has led some sources to call the medal the "Medal For Valor", and the Philippine Army itself refers to it this way. However, other official Philippine government sources refer to it as the "Medal of Valor".

Symbolism
The sea-lion represents the Office of the President of the Philippines. The eight-rayed sun represents the eight Philippine provinces that revolted against Spain. The blue ripples represent the Armed Forces of the Philippines. The crossed swords represent conflict with the enemy in defense of the nation; the three stars represent Luzon, Visayas and Mindanao, the three island groups of the Philippines, while the sampaguita wreath symbolizes the highest honor for courage and gallantry. The red coloration signifies bravery.

Recipient's privileges
The Medal For Valor recipient, his widow, or her dependents are privileged to receive preferential treatment when applying for government work, public housing, loans not exceeding ₱500,000, and lease or acquisition of public land.

In addition, they are exempt from tuition fees in public and private schools and other institutions of learning. Children of the recipient who wish to attend the Philippine Military Academy, if qualified, receive priority for commission into the Armed Forces of the Philippines upon graduation. They also receive free medication from both public and private hospitals.

Other privileges include a 20% discount on hotel bills, transportation services, restaurants, theaters, carnivals, and when purchasing pharmaceutical drugs. Government entities or private companies who deny the recipient these privileges are penalized with up to six years imprisonment and a fine not exceeding ₱300,000.

List of recipients
There have been 41 Medal of Valor recipients since 1935. Of these recipients, 17 are living. , five of them were in active service: Cirilito Sobejana, Bartolome Vicente Bacarro, Noel Buan, Herbert Dilag and Custodio Parcon. Buan retired from active service in 2018.

The portraits of Medal of Valor recipients are displayed in the Hall of Heroes at Camp Aguinaldo, headquarters of the Armed Forces of the Philippines in Quezon City. The Hall of Valor at the Philippine Military Academy also showcases the portraits of PMA Medal of Valor recipients.

Philippine Army

Philippine Navy and Marine Corps

Philippine Army Air Corps and Air Force

Philippine Constabulary

United States Army

Discrepancies in the record
The official number of Philippine Medal of Valor recipients is currently given as forty-one (41). However, Mary Grace Baloyo, a Philippine Air Force pilot who died in a crash on 26 March 2001 and is on record as being conferred the medal by former President Gloria Macapagal Arroyo on 3 April 2001, is not included in the summary of recipients.

Statistics

Notes
1.The Philippine Constabulary was merged with the Integrated National Police on 29 January 1991, forming the Philippine National Police.

References

Further reading
 The AFP Adjutant General, Awards and Decorations Handbook, 1995, 1997, OTAG.
 Decorations and Medals of the Philippines

 
Military awards and decorations of the Philippines